The Women's combined competition of the Calgary 1988 Olympics was held at Nakiska.

The defending world champion was Erika Hess of Switzerland, while Switzerland's Brigitte Ortli was the defending World Cup combined champion, and led the 1988 World Cup.

Results

References 

Women's combined
Alp
Oly